Hackness is a village and civil parish in the Scarborough district of the county of North Yorkshire, England. It lies within the North York Moors National Park. The parish population rose from 125 in the 2001 UK census to 221 in the 2011 UK census.

Heritage
Hackness is mentioned as the site of a double monastery or nunnery by Bede, writing in the early 8th century. The present Church of Saint Peter is a Grade I listed building, parts of which date from the 11th century.

The church also possesses fragments of a high cross dating from the late 8th or early 9th century. These preserve parts of a Latin prayer for Saint Æthelburh and an illegible inscription, apparently in the runic alphabet.

Hackness Hall and its landscape gardens were created in the 1790s. The house, a Grade I listed building, was commissioned by Sir Richard Van den Bempde-Johnstone, who had inherited the estate through his mother. A new entrance was added in 1810. Fire damage in 1910 was restored under the direction of Walter Brierley.

Governance
Hackness & Harwood Dale Group Parish Council covers a total of the six parishes: Broxa-cum-Troutsdale, Darncombe-cum-Langdale End, Hackness, Harwood Dale, Silpho and Suffield-cum-Everley.

Sports
There is a tennis club in the village with three grass courts and two hard courts, on the road to Lowdales and Highdales. The club was able to celebrate 90 years of tennis in Hackness in 2013.

Notable people
In birth order:
Hilda of Whitby (c. 614–680), saint, died in Hackness.
Begu (nun) (died 690), saint, lived in the Nunnery in Hackness.
Sir Thomas Posthumous Hoby (1566–1640) was lord of the manor and a possible inspiration for Shakespeare's Malvolio in Twelfth Night.
Margaret, Lady Hoby (1571–1633) kept the earliest known female diary in English (1599–1605).
Matthew Noble (1818–1876), sculptor, made the bust of William Smith (geologist), who was employed at Hackness Hall.
Arthur Irvin (1848–1945), cricketer and clergyman

References

External links

Hackness & Harwood Dale Group Parish Council website

 
Villages in North Yorkshire
Civil parishes in North Yorkshire
Borough of Scarborough